Caer Gybi may refer to:

Caer Gybi (fort), the small Roman fort and site of Saint Cybi's monastery at Holyhead, Wales
the Welsh name for Holyhead, the settlement which grew up around the fort